Chentougang station is a station on Line 22 of the Guangzhou Metro that began operations on 31 March 2022. It is situated underground at the Shibi Subdistrict.

Station Layout

Exits

References

Guangzhou Metro Line 22
Guangzhou Metro stations in Panyu District